The 2015 Russell Athletic Bowl was a post-season American college football bowl game played on December 29, 2015 at the Orlando Citrus Bowl in Orlando, Florida. The 26th edition of the Russell Athletic Bowl featured the North Carolina Tar Heels of the Atlantic Coast Conference against the Baylor Bears of the Big 12 Conference. It began at 5:30 p.m. EST and aired on ESPN.  It was one of the 2015–16 bowl games that concluded the 2015 FBS football season.  The game's naming rights sponsor was the Russell Athletic uniform company.

Teams
The game featured the North Carolina Tar Heels against the Baylor Bears.

North Carolina Tar Heels

After finishing their season 11–2, the Tar Heels accepted their invitation to play in the game.

This was the Tar Heels' second Russell Athletic Bowl; they had previously won the 1995 Carquest Bowl, defeating Arkansas by a score of 20–10.

Baylor Bears

After finishing their season 9–3, the Bears accepted their invitation to play in the game.

Game summary

Scoring summary

Statistics

References

Russell Athletic Bowl
Cheez-It Bowl
North Carolina Tar Heels football bowl games
Baylor Bears football bowl games
Russell Athletic Bowl
December 2015 sports events in the United States
2010s in Orlando, Florida